George A. Banker (August 8, 1874 – December 1, 1917) was an American track cyclist.

Major results
1894
1st Grand Prix de Paris
2nd World Sprint Championships
2nd Grand Prix de l'UVF
1895
1st Grand Prix de l'UVF
3rd Grand Prix de Paris
1898
1st  World Sprint Championships

References

1874 births
1917 deaths
American male cyclists
Sportspeople from Pittsburgh
UCI Track Cycling World Champions (men)
American track cyclists